Amazon Prime Video is a global on-demand Internet streaming media provider, owned and operated by Amazon, that distributes a number of original programs that includes original series, specials, miniseries, documentaries, and films.

Original films

Feature films

Documentaries

Specials

Stand-up comedy specials

Upcoming original films

Feature films

Notes

References

Lists of films by studio
Amazon (company)